People Like Us is a British radio and TV comedy programme, a spoof on-location documentary (or mockumentary) written by John Morton, and starring Chris Langham as Roy Mallard, an inept interviewer. Originally a radio show for BBC Radio 4 in three series from 1995 to 1997, it was made into two television series for BBC Two broadcast between September 1999 and June 2001.

Radio version
Each episode features the affable, bumbling BBC journalist Roy Mallard following a day in the lives of representatives of a particular career or lifestyle. A comedy of wordplay and misunderstanding, People Like Us builds on an inept protagonist helpless as forced to relate to the absurdity incarnated in the "professionals" he meets, where his relatively sensible inquiry fails in front of the disproportionate facts.

A regularly recurring joke is that of the shocked reactions Mallard gets as he reveals he is married – ranging from disbelief to exaggerated congratulations, from invitations to be more realistic to database systems refusals to accept such a piece of data. These bewilderments may root in the frequent hints throughout the episodes that Mallard is not just oddly looking (e.g. the patient at the doctor's recognizing walls and windows but giving up deciding what Mallard was), but terribly dishevelled – as it is even seen in one extremely rare shot including him in the video recording (as he is helping fixing presentation equipment). Another recurring theme is Mallard's quest for a coffee, or a meal, or even a room fit for a good night's sleep. 

The character of Roy Mallard was based on an exaggeration of the writer John Morton himself. Morton had been a fan of Chris Langham's performances since seeing him on Smith and Jones, and had Langham's voice in mind when he was writing the scripts.

At the end of each episode, as Dave Brubeck's "Unsquare Dance" is played, the mockumentary cast is credited as a list of people to which Roy Mallard is grateful («Roy Mallard would like to give a special "thank you" to Chris Langham...»).

The radio show was named Best Radio Comedy at the British Comedy Awards in both 1996 and 1997  as well as winning a gold Sony Radio Award for best comedy.

Television version
Eleven of the radio episodes were adapted for TV, with one original episode – "The Actor". The TV version featured an array of acclaimed guest stars including Bill Nighy, David Tennant, Geoffrey Whitehead and Tamsin Greig.

Mallard is hardly visible in the TV episodes. He is usually just out of sight, but viewers can spot him, or part of him, in every episode; on one occasion he is reflected with the camera in a shop window. Much of the humour is verbal as characters take a literal interpretation of what others say, use redundant expressions and non-sequiturs. Alongside this verbal aspect there was more conventional humour. Mallard encountered bizarre behaviour from his featured characters and their counterparts. For all his own mediocrity and haplessness he could appear sane and competent compared to those alongside him.  The lack of laugh track and the dead-pan approach led some viewers to believe they were encountering a "straight" documentary.

A third series was planned but was cancelled in favour of The Office.

The TV version was well received, with the first series winning the 1999 Silver Rose d'Or for comedy.

Home video release
The first TV series was released on VHS and DVD on 16 September 2002. The second was due to be released in 2003 but was cancelled, eventually being released (in Australia only) in November 2007. In September 2009 the complete two series were released in the United States on region 1 NTSC DVD. The second series was finally released on DVD in the UK on 24 May 2010.

List of episodes

Radio series

Television series

See also
The Sunday Format
Delve Special

References

External links
 
  Comedy Guide
 
People Like Us (TV) and People Like Us (radio) series from Epguides
 People Like Us (radio Show) from an Angelfire website

1995 radio programme debuts
1999 British television series debuts
2001 British television series endings
1990s British comedy television series
2000s British comedy television series
BBC television comedy
BBC Radio comedy programmes
British mockumentary television series
Television series about television
British parody television series
Radio programs adapted into television shows
Television series based on radio series
Television articles with incorrect naming style
People_Like_Us